The General Electric F414 is an American afterburning turbofan engine in the 22,000-pound (98 kN) thrust class produced by GE Aviation. The F414 originated from GE's widely used F404 turbofan, enlarged and improved for use in the Boeing F/A-18E/F Super Hornet. The engine was developed from the F412 non-afterburning turbofan planned for the A-12 Avenger II, before it was canceled.

Design and development

Origins
GE evolved the F404 into the F412-GE-400 non-afterburning turbofan for the McDonnell Douglas A-12 Avenger II. After the cancellation of the A-12, the research was directed toward an engine for the F/A-18E/F Super Hornet. GE successfully pitched the F414 as a low-risk derivative of the F404, rather than a riskier new engine. The F414 engine was originally envisioned as not using any materials or processes not used in the F404, and was designed to fit in the same footprint as the F404.

The F414 uses the core and full-authority digital engine control (FADEC) from the F412, and the low-pressure system from the YF120 engine developed for the Advanced Tactical Fighter competition. One of the major differences between the F404 and the F414 is the fan section. The F414 fan is larger than that of the F404, but smaller than the  F412 fan. The larger fan increases the engine airflow by 16% and is  longer. Also changed from the F404 is the construction of the first three stages of the high-pressure compressor which are blisks rather than separate discs and dovetailed blades, saving  in weight. The F414 uses a "fueldraulic" system to control the area of the convergent-divergent nozzle in the afterburner section. The nozzle actuators use engine fuel whereas the F404 uses an engine hydraulic system. "Fueldraulic" actuators for afterburner nozzles have been used since the 1960s on the Pratt & Whitney J58 and Rolls-Royce Turbomeca Adour, for example. They are also used to swivel the VTOL nozzle for the Rolls-Royce LiftSystem.

Further development
The F414 continues to be improved, both through internal GE efforts and federally funded development programs.  By 2006 GE  had tested an Enhanced Durability Engine (EDE) with an advanced core.  The EDE engine provided a 15% thrust increase or longer life without the thrust increase. It has a six-stage high-pressure compressor (down from 7 stages in the standard F414) and an advanced high-pressure turbine. The new compressor should be about 3% more efficient. The new high-pressure turbine uses new materials and a new way of delivering cooling air to the blades. These changes should increase the turbine temperature capability by about 150 °F (83 °C).  The EDE is designed to have better foreign object damage resistance, and a reduced fuel burn rate.

The EDE program continued with the testing of an advanced two stage blade-disk or "blisk" fan.  The first advanced fan was produced using traditional methods, but future blisk fans will be made using translational friction welding with the goal of reducing manufacturing costs. GE touts that this latest variant yields either a 20% increase in thrust or threefold increase in hot-section durability over the current F414.  This version is called the Enhanced Performance Engine (EPE) and was partially funded through the federal Integrated High Performance Turbine Engine Technology (or IHPTET) program.

Other possible F414 improvements include efforts to reduce engine noise by using either mechanical or fluidic chevrons and efforts to reduce emissions with a new trapped vortex combustor. Chevrons would reduce engine noise by inducing mixing between the cooler, slower bypass air and the hotter, faster core exhaust air. Mechanical chevrons would come in the form of triangular cutouts (or extensions) at the end of the nozzle, resulting in a "sharktooth" pattern. Fluidic chevrons would operate by injecting differential air flows around the exhaust to achieve the same ends as the mechanical variety. A new combustor would likely aim to reduce emissions by burning a higher percentage of the oxygen, thereby reducing the amount of oxygen available to bond with nitrogen forming the pollutant NOx.

As of 2009, the F414-EDE was being developed and tested, under a United States Navy contract for a reduced specific fuel consumption (SFC) demonstrator engine. In addition, General Electric has tested F414 engines equipped with a second low-pressure turbine stage made from ceramic matrix composites (CMC). The F414 represents the first successful use of a CMC in a rotating engine part. The tests proved CMCs are strong enough to endure the heat and rotational stress inside the turbine. The advantage CMC offers is a weight one third that of metal alloy and the ability to operate without cooling air, making the engine more aerodynamically efficient and fuel efficient.  The new turbine is not yet ready for a production aircraft, however, as further design changes are needed to make it more robust.

Over 1,000 F414 engines have been delivered and the engine family has totaled over 1 million flight hours by 2010.

Variants

F414-GE-400 Flies in the Boeing F/A-18E/F Super Hornet.  Also proposed for the unbuilt naval F-117N variant of the F-117 Nighthawk.
F414-EDE "Enhanced Durability Engine" or "EDE", includes an improved high-pressure turbine (HPT) and high-pressure compressor (HPC). The HPT is redesigned to withstand slightly higher temperatures and includes aerodynamic changes. The HPC has been redesigned to 6 stages, down from 7. These changes aimed at reducing SFC by 2% and component durability three times higher.
F414-EPE  "Enhanced Performance Engine" or "EPE", includes a new core and a redesigned fan and compressor.
F414M Used by the EADS Mako/HEAT. Derated thrust to 12,500 lbf (55.6 kN) dry and 16,850 lbf (75 kN) wet.  Proposed for international versions of the Korean T-50 series of trainers and fighter aircraft, but later superseded by a new offer with a standard F414.
F414-G Produced for the Saab JAS 39 Gripen Demonstator.  Slightly modified for use in a single engine Gripen, instead of a twin-engine aircraft like the F/A-18. With it, the Gripen Demonstrator reached Mach 1.2 in supercruise (without afterburner).
F414BJ Proposed for the Dassault Falcon SSBJ.
F414-GE-INS6 India's Aeronautical Development Agency (ADA) selected the F414-GE-INS6 to power HAL Tejas Mark 2 of the Indian Air Force (IAF). India ordered 99 engines in October 2010. It produces more thrust than previous versions, and features a Full Authority Digital Electronics Control (FADEC) system. The engines are to be delivered by 2013.
F414-GE-39E (GE RM16) New version of the F414G for the Saab JAS-39E/F Gripen.
F414-GE-400K Variant of the F414-GE-400 co-developed by General Electric and Hanwha Aerospace for the South Korean KAI KF-X, to be manufactured jointly and assembled locally in South Korea by Hanwha Aerospace.
F414-GE-100 A version custom made to drive NASA's X-59 Quiet SuperSonic Technology X-plane. Derived from the F414-GE-39E modifications include different control software, fuel piping and lack of mounting rails. Two units were made.

Applications
 Boeing F/A-18E/F Super Hornet
 EADS Mako/HEAT
 HAL Tejas Mk2
 HAL TEDBF
 HAL AMCA
 KAI KF-21 Boramae
 Lockheed Martin X-59 QueSST
 Saab JAS 39E/F Gripen

Specifications (F414-400)

See also

References

External links

 GE Aviation F414 page
 F414 page on GlobalSecurity.org

Low-bypass turbofan engines
F414
1990s turbofan engines